Solace is the second studio album by Canadian singer-songwriter Sarah McLachlan, released on 29 June 1991, on Nettwerk in Canada and 28 January 1992, on Arista Records in the United States. It was the album that first made her a star in Canada, spawning the hit singles "The Path of Thorns (Terms)" and "Into the Fire" and being certified double platinum for sales of 200,000 copies in Canada.  This was also the first of many Sarah McLachlan albums produced by Pierre Marchand.

Although the album received favourable reviews internationally, her commercial breakthrough outside of Canada would not come until her next full album, Fumbling Towards Ecstasy. Although McLachlan has not discarded the album’s songs from her concerts so completely as those of Touch, nothing from Solace has been performed live since 1999 except for “The Path of Thorns (Terms)”, which was performed 19 times between 2010 and 2012.

Track listing

 In Canada, "Wear Your Love Like Heaven" appeared on Nettwerk's Donovan tribute album, Island of Circles.  McLachlan fought hard to not have the song on her album but she eventually let Arista Records include it on the release.

Personnel
Sarah McLachlan – Vocals, Acoustic Guitar, Piano
Pierre Marchand – Electric Guitar, Mandolin, Bass, Piano, Organ, Keyboards, Accordion Reeds, Percussion
Bill Dillon – Acoustic and Electric Guitars, Mandolin, Pedal Steel, Guitorgan, Billatron
Leo Nocentelli – Electric Guitar
Daryl Exnicious – Bass, Background Vocals
Hugh McMillan – Bass
Jocelyne Lanois – Bass
Alan Gevaert – Bass
Deni Bonet – Violin, Viola
Peter "Harpy" Conway – Harmonica
Ronald Jones – Drums, Percussion
Paul Brennan – Drums
Ashwin Sood – Drums
Michel Dupirre – Percussion
Ken "Hiwatt" Marshall, Greg Reely – Engineers
Andre Paquet – Freelancer
Kharen Hill Album photography for publicity and artwork

Charts

Weekly charts

Year-end charts

Certifications and sales

References 

1991 albums
Sarah McLachlan albums
Nettwerk Records albums
Arista Records albums
Albums produced by Pierre Marchand
Folk rock albums by Canadian artists